Queen's College is a residential college affiliated with the University of Melbourne providing accommodation to more than 300 students who attend the University of Melbourne, the Victorian College of the Arts, RMIT University and Monash University Faculty of Pharmacy and Pharmaceutical Sciences.

In addition to the students (commonly referred to as "Queeners"), Queen's College (usually known simply as "Queen's") also houses a number of fellows, resident tutors, scholars and professionals (collectively known as the Senior Common Room), staff and academic guests.

The resident tutors conduct weekly tutorials for the students on subjects that are involved in their expertise.

History

Founding
While this land was allocated soon after the founding of the university in 1853, it was not until 1878—some twenty-five years later—that the Methodist Conference took the first steps towards building the college.

The then Governor of Victoria, Sir Henry Loch, laid the foundation stone on 16 June 1887 after the efforts of the Reverend William Abraham Quick, who is widely regarded as the founder of Queen's.

Naming
Initially, it was decided that the college was to be named Victoria College. However, when it became clear that it was to be built in the year of Queen Victoria's golden jubilee, it was finalised in December 1886: "That the new College be called Queen's College in honour of the Queen's Jubilee"

Opening

Queen's opened its doors on 16 March 1889, with a total of 24 students, under the leadership of the Revd Edward Holdsworth Sugden, who would go on to hold the position of master for over forty years. Shortly afterward, it became clear that more building was necessary, and on 20 April 1890, the South Wing was opened. Subsequent extensions were made in 1905 and in 1910 a new East Wing was created, joining the new southern wing with the original sections.

During this time (from 1897 to 1920), it is noted that "Queen's College was a veritable hothouse of dramatic activity", with plays and soirees being performed several times annually. Melbourne University Student Theatre traces its roots to this time, and it is no wonder that promotional posters from these productions still adorn the walls of the college to this day.

Expansion

Post-Great War pressures nurtured additional building plans, advocated mainly by J. T. Tweddle. The central tower (named the Sugden tower after the first master of the college, the Revd Edward J. Holdsworth Sugden) and a new northern wing, known as the Tweddle Wing, were constructed and completed in 1923. 1930 saw the introduction of a scientific laboratory (which now serves as a student recreation centre) in the southern section of the college, courtesy of A. M. and G. R. Nicholas.

From 1958 to 1978, a significant expansion and improvement programme was enacted, partly funded by the Commonwealth Government. The Raynor C. Johnson Wing, named after the college's third master and erected in the west of the college grounds, was completed in two stages. The first opened in 1961, with the second following eight years later. During the construction of the Johnson Wing, it became clear that the dining hall (which now serves as the Junior Common Room) was too small to contain the projected student body. As such, the current Eakins Hall was built, finished in 1964. The final student accommodation building, Kernick House, was completed in 1975.

In 1964,  of college land was allocated for the creation of a women's college. The college, named St Hilda's, is now a coeducational facility as by the time it was completed Queen's was also accepting both men and women as equal members.

For a decade from 1969, Queen's had also been ensuring that the pre-existing facilities would attain the same standard as the new wing. The resulting "comfortable, single bedroom studies" remain much the same format today. Also around this time, the Methodist Church merged with most parishes of the Presbyterian Church to form the Uniting Church in Australia, of which the college became an institution.

Coinciding with the college's centenary celebrations, the new Featonby Library and several tutor flats contained in Parnaby Wing were opened in 1987. More recently, the college has focused on expanding accommodation for academic visitors, postgraduate students and resident tutors, with the construction of Scott Terrace(1998), Jack Clarke and Lapthorne buildings (2000). In 2012, the Honourable Alex Chernov AC QC, Governor of Victoria, official opened two new wings of graduate accommodation with facilities for 54 graduate residences.

Traditions

Every Monday (previously both Monday and Tuesday night) Queen's College students must wear their academic gowns and venture down to Eakins dining hall to sit for a Formal Dinner.

The Master reads out a prayer whilst all students stand. Once the prayer is finished, dinner is served.
A Queen's College traditional method of serving food is incorporated in the dinner. One end of the table serves meat, while the other serves vegetables.

A tradition brought from the Oxbridge college systems is the wearing of tweed to formal dinners, which is an optional tradition that most students no longer observe.

The "spoon-bang" is still observed with vigor at the start of formal dinners to celebrate the winning of Queen's College teams in sports, cultural and academic competitions.

Arms
The college's coat of arms celebrates its founding as a Methodist institution, in the tradition of the 18th-century Anglican cleric John Wesley. It has the following heraldic description:

Argent, a cross sable, in each quarter three escallops of the last, for Wesley; on an escutcheon of pretence the Royal Arms of England. Crest: on a wreath and sable, a wyvern proper.  Motto: Aedificamus in aeternum.

The actual rendering of the escutcheon uses the royal arms not of England but of the United Kingdom.
This is superimposed on the arms of John Wesley.

The college motto translates to "We build for eternity".

The arms were assumed without a formal grant from the College of Arms.

Grace
It is customary to open each formal dinner (held every Monday and Tuesday night) at Queen's with a grace.
The college's full Latin grace is as follows:

Domine, qui aperis manum tuam et omnia implentur bonitate,
Benedicere dignare cibum istum
Ut nos, ex eo gustantes,
Inde corporis et animi accipiamus sanitatem.
Per Jesum Christum Dominum nostrum, Amen.

An English translation is:

"Lord, you open your generous hand
And the whole world is filled with good things.
Please bless this food we are about to eat,
So that we may have healthy bodies and healthy minds,
Through Jesus Christ our Lord, Amen."

An English grace was composed by Henley in 1995, with the proviso that the Latin grace be retained at least once per week.

Head of college

Masters
 The Revd Edward Sugden (1887 - 1928)
 The Revd Frederick Walwyn Kernick (1929 - 1933)
 John F. Foster (1933 - 1934) - acting master
 Raynor Johnson (1934 - 1964)
 The Revd Norman Edgar Lade (1964 - 1965) - acting master
 Owen Parnaby (1966 - 1986)
 George A. M. Scott, FLS (1986 - 1992)
 Jack William Clarke, OAM (1992) - acting master
 The Revd John A. Henley, (1993 - 2001)
 David T. Runia, FAHA (2002 – 2016)
 Dr Stewart Gill, OAM (2017–present)

Vice-masters
 Jack Clarke (1964 - 1989)
 Philip Creed (1989 - 1991)
 Robert Nethercote (1991 - 2002)
 Phillip Mosley (2002 - 2014)

Deans
Dean of Students (known as Dean of Wellbeing 2014 - 2017)
 Dr Tim Corney (2015 - 2016)
 Jacob Workman (2017 - 2019)

Dean of Academic Programs (known as Dean of Studies 2014 - 2017)
 Dr Brenda Holt (2015 - 2016)
 Jacob Workman (June 2016) 
 Dr Sally Dalton-Brown (2017 - 2021)
 Campbell Bairstow (2021) [Acting]
 Dr Lesa Scholl (2021-Present)

Notable alumni 

"Wyverns" are residents, past or present, who have lived in the college for six months or more. The Wyvern Society is responsible for allowing the continued communication of former Queen's students and organising reunions.

Notable Wyverns include:
 David Penington (former Vice-Chancellor of the University of Melbourne, former dean of its School of Medicine)
 Roy Wright (former Chancellor of the University of Melbourne)
 Geoffrey Blainey (historian)
 Ian Potter (businessman and philanthropist)
 Harold Holt (former Prime Minister of Australia)
 Brian Howe (former Deputy Prime Minister of Australia)
 Surgeon Rear Admiral Lionel Lockwood (former Director-General of Naval Medical Services)
Cyril P. Callister (inventor of Vegemite)
 Red Symons (musician and comedian)
 Alan Hopgood (writer and actor)
 John Holland (engineer and construction magnate)
 Merlin Crossley (biochemist)
 Kathy Watt (cyclist)
 Ismail Abdul Rahman (former Deputy Prime Minister of Malaysia)
 Mustapa Mohamed (current Minister of Trade of Malaysia)
 Rod Sims (Economist and current Australian Competition & Consumer Commission chairman)

Rhodes Scholars
 Peter H. Bailey AM OBE, Queen's 1945, Rhodes Scholar 1950
 S. E. K. Hulme AM QC, Queen's 1948, Rhodes Scholar 1952
 John R. Howes, Queen’s 1953, Rhodes Scholar 1957
 Wilfrid R. Prest, Queen’s 1959, Rhodes Scholar 1962
 Michael C. Garner, Queen’s 1978, Rhodes Scholar 1984
 P. Merlin Crossley, Queen’s 1982, Rhodes Scholar 1987
 Matt Wenham, Queen’s 2004, Rhodes Scholar 2004.
 Michiel le Roux, Queen's 2003, Rhodes Scholar 2006

Fellows
Queen's has a body of 24 fellows and a smaller body of honorary fellows. Fellows of Queen's College are not actively engaged in teaching the students. Instead, they are men and women who have distinguished themselves through their contributions to academic studies general contributions society. The chief task of the fellows is to advise the master on academic affairs and giving of scholarships to students of the college. They are led by the principal fellow.

References

Bibliography
 Queen's College Handbook [2005] & 2006
 Queen's College, University of Melbourne - A Centenary History, Owen Parnaby, Melbourne University Press, Carlton, Melbourne - first edition , 1990  
 Trinity College Act (1927)
 History of Melbourne University Student Theatre

External links
Queen's College Website

Residential colleges of the University of Melbourne